Howchin Lake is a lake, one of several in the Alph River system, located  southeast of the snout of Howchin Glacier in the Denton Hills, Scott Coast, Antarctica. It was named by the New Zealand Geographic Board in 1994 in association with Howchin Glacier.

References

Lakes of Victoria Land
Scott Coast